The Bushwhackers is a 1925 Australian silent film directed by Raymond Longford loosely based on Alfred Tennyson's 1864 poem Enoch Arden. It is considered a lost film.

Plot
Bill Lawson (Eddie O'Reilly), a wharf labourer, loses his job and decides to go out bush to find work to support his wife Elsa (Stella Southern) and daughter Betty. He befriends a well-born Englishman, Kenneth Hillyard (Rawdon Blandford) after rescuing him from two thugs and the two decide to go prospecting together. They have a variety of adventures before stumbling upon a gold deposit. Then while walking along the cliffs one day Bill slips and falls into the river below. Kenneth looks for him but can't find the body and Bill is believed to be dead. Kenneth returns to the city to share the gold with Elsa and Betty. When Kenneth inherits money from an English relative, he proposes to Elsa.

Years later a bush character appears, 'Mad Joe', who is Bill – it turns out Bill survived the fall but lost his memory. He later regains his memory after a hospital operation and tracks down his wife. But once he sees how happy she is with Kenneth, he returns to the bush.

Cast
Eddie O'Reilly as Bill Lawson
Stella Southern as Elsa Lawson
Beryl Gow as Bill's daughter
Rawdon Blandford as Kenneth Hillyard
Margaret Reid
Billy Ryan

Production
Actor Rawdon Blandford wrote a song especially for the film. He later described this and other Australian films he made as "not great efforts" and criticised the quality of Australian directors.

Co-star Eddie O'Reilly was a sometime boxer.

Australasian Films bought the film outright from Longford and Lyell for its production cost.

Reception
The critic from The Bulletin said
The photographer has done justice to^the excellence of Australian scenery for his purposes, but in other respects the picture is only saved from complete failure by the comedy touches. The story...  wallows along under a large top hamper of irrelevances. There is a host of uninteresting characters to confuse the audience, and mawkish sub-titles crop up every few feet, with a wordy explanation of almost every movement... amateurish and disappointing.
The critic from the Sydney Morning Herald said that the film's merits:
Lie mainly in its beauty of scenery and photography. There is no plot, as the word is commonly understood. The story simply meanders onward, without complication and without any very definite aim, so that it might be cut off almost anywhere without seeming incomplete... This narrative is embellished with a profusion of irrelevant detail... Characters appear In bewilding profusion, and in a moment or two are gone for ever. Through the midst flows a torrent of wordy subtleties, fully half of which could be eliminated with advantage to the picture... Those who appear before the camera make little pretence of acting, beyond a little buffoonery. Yet, all its weaknesses admitted, the film still retains the interest given it by pleasant comedy touches, and by clearly photographed studies of the harbour, the Blue Mountains, and the rolling f¡elds.

References

External links

The Bushwhackers at National Film and Sound Archive

1925 films
Australian drama films
Australian silent films
Lost Australian films
Australian black-and-white films
Films based on Enoch Arden
Films directed by Raymond Longford
1925 drama films
1925 lost films
Lost drama films
Silent drama films